Newton Ramsay Colter (July 30, 1844 – April 6, 1917) was a physician and political figure in New Brunswick, Canada. He represented Carleton in the House of Commons of Canada from 1892 to 1896 as a Liberal member.

He was born in Sheffield, New Brunswick, the son of Alexander Colter, a native of Ireland. Colter was educated at the Sackville Academy and at Harvard University, where he received an M.D. In 1867, he was licensed to practice by the Royal College of Physicians in London. Colter married E. Jane Hatt in 1871. He served as chairman of the Board of Health at Woodstock. Colter was defeated in a bid for reelection in 1896.

By-election:   On election of 1891 being declared void

References 
 
The Canadian parliamentary companion, 1891 JA Gemmill

1844 births
1917 deaths
Harvard Medical School alumni
Members of the House of Commons of Canada from New Brunswick
Liberal Party of Canada MPs